The Bram Stoker Award for Best Anthology is an award presented by the Horror Writers Association (HWA) for "superior achievement" in horror writing for an anthology.

Winners and nominees
Nominees are listed below the winner(s) for each year.

References

External links
 Stoker Award on the HWA web page
 Graphical listing of all Bram Stoker award winners and nominees

Anthology
Anthology awards
Awards established in 1998
1998 establishments in the United States
English-language literary awards